Burrville is an unincorporated community in Sevier County, Utah, United States. It was founded in 1876 by a homesteader and rancher by the name of Charles C. Burr.

The area code is 435, and the ZIP code is 84701.

See also

References

External links

Unincorporated communities in Sevier County, Utah
Unincorporated communities in Utah